The Oranjezaal refers to a painted ballroom in the Royal palace Huis ten Bosch in the Hague. It was once, together with its neighboring Chinese room, part of the first national museum of the Netherlands founded in 1800 called the Nationale Konst-Gallery. The supervisor Cornelis Sebille Roos appointed Jan Gerard Waldorp as the first custodian and curator to receive visitors (for 6 stuivers) and explain the collection.

The Oranjezaal or Orange room was commissioned upon the death of Frederik Hendrik in 1647 and was built during the years 1648-1651 by Jacob van Campen under the direction of Constantijn Huygens and Amalia van Solms. The painters were chosen as the best of the Netherlands who painted in the style of Rubens, and were mostly of the Catholic faith. A total of 31 paintings were made to decorate the room from floor to ceiling and the result became part of the first national museum of the Netherlands. It is still considered one of the highlights of Dutch Golden Age painting, but is not open to the public.

Besides Jacob van Campen, the painters Theodoor van Thulden, Caesar van Everdingen, Salomon de Bray, Thomas Willeboirts Bosschaert, Jan Lievens, Christiaen van Couwenbergh, Pieter Soutman, Gonzales Coques, Jacob Jordaens, Pieter de Grebber, Adriaen Hanneman and Gerard van Honthorst all made contributions.

References

 De Nationale Konste-Gallery en het Koninklijk Museum, a history of the Rijksmuseum, by E.W. Moes and Eduard van Biema

Paintings in The Hague
Rijksmonuments in The Hague